The bill , long title "To provide for the conveyance of a small parcel of National Forest System land in Los Padres National Forest in California, and for other purposes" is a bill that would authorize the exchange of 5 acres of land in the Los Padres National Forest for unspecified lands owned by the White Lotus Foundation. If the land exchange does not occur within two years, the Forest Service would offer to sell the land to the foundation, and the proceeds would be deposited in the Treasury.

The White Lotus Foundation is a yoga training school and retreat center.

The bill passed in the United States House of Representatives during the 113th United States Congress.

Background

Yoga is the physical, mental, and spiritual practices or disciplines which originated in ancient India with a view to attain a state of permanent peace.  The term yoga can be derived from either of two roots, yujir yoga (to yoke) or yuj samādhau (to concentrate). According to Yoga-Yajnavalkya, Yoga is the union of the individual psyche with the transcendental self.

In the 1980s, yoga became popular as a system of physical exercise across the Western world. This form of yoga is often called Hatha yoga. Many studies have tried to determine the effectiveness of yoga as a complementary intervention for cancer, schizophrenia, asthma, and heart disease. In a national survey, long-term yoga practitioners in the United States reported musculo–skeletal and mental health improvements.

Provisions of the bill
This summary is based largely on the summary provided by the Congressional Research Service, a public domain source.

H.R. 3008 would authorize the Secretary of Agriculture (USDA), if the White Lotus Foundation in Santa Barbara, California, offers to convey to the Secretary a parcel of non-federal land that is acceptable to the Secretary and the Secretary accepts the offer, to convey approximately five acres of certain identified National Forest System land in Santa Barbara County to the Foundation.

The bill would subject the land exchange to provisions under the Federal Land Policy and Management Act of 1976 related to exchanges of public lands and interests therein within the National Forest System.

The bill would express the intent of Congress that the land exchange be completed within two years of enactment of this Act. The bill would also allow the Secretary to offer to sell to the White Lotus Foundation the federal land for fair market value if such exchange is not completed by such time.

The bill would make the land exchange and any such sale subject to specified additional terms and conditions, including to valid existing rights and the White Lotus Foundation paying the reasonable costs of surveys, appraisals, and other administrative costs associated with the exchange or sale.

The bill would require land conveyed by exchange or sale under this Act to be appraised by an independent appraiser selected by the Secretary and such an appraisal to be conducted in accordance with nationally recognized appraisal standards.

Congressional Budget Office report
This summary is based largely on the summary provided by the Congressional Budget Office, as ordered reported by the House Committee on Natural Resources on November 14, 2013. This is a public domain source.

The Congressional Budget Office (CBO) estimates that enacting H.R. 3008 would have a negligible impact on the budget. The bill would authorize the exchange of 5 acres of land in the Los Padres National Forest for unspecified lands owned by the White Lotus Foundation. If the land exchange does not occur within two years, the Forest Service would offer to sell the land to the foundation, and the proceeds would be deposited in the Treasury.

If the Forest Service sold the affected land to the foundation, enacting H.R. 3008 would increase offsetting receipts, which are treated as reductions in direct spending; therefore, pay-as-you-go procedures apply. Based on information regarding the value of lands near the affected federal land, the CBO estimates that enacting the legislation could increase offsetting receipts by less than $300,000 after 2015. Enacting the legislation would not affect revenues.

H.R. 3008 contains no intergovernmental or private-sector mandates as defined in the Unfunded Mandates Reform Act and would not affect the budgets of state, local, or tribal governments.

Procedural history
H.R. 3008 was introduced into the United States House of Representatives on August 2, 2013 by Rep. Lois Capps (D, CA-24). It was referred to the United States House Committee on Natural Resources and the United States House Natural Resources Subcommittee on Public Lands and Environmental Regulation. It was reported (amended) alongside House Report 113-295. It passed the House on January 27, 2014 in Roll Call Vote 25 by 367-27. It was received in the Senate on January 28, 2014 and referred to the United States Senate Committee on Energy and Natural Resources.

Debate and discussion
All of the votes against the bill were from Republicans.

The Committee report on the bill indicated that the White Lotus Foundation would have to close without the land due to a lack of accessibility.

See also
List of bills in the 113th United States Congress

Notes/References

External links

Library of Congress - Thomas H.R. 3008
beta.congress.gov H.R. 3008
GovTrack.us H.R. 3008
OpenCongress.org H.R. 3008
WashingtonWatch.com H.R. 3008
House Republican Conference's Legislative Digest on H.R. 3008
House Report 113-295 on H.R. 3008

Proposed legislation of the 113th United States Congress